Ghoshpukur College, is a new general degree college in Goshpukur, Phansidewa block, Darjeeling district. It offers undergraduate courses in arts,science and commerce. It is affiliated to the University of North Bengal.

Departments
English 
Bengali
Hindi
Education
Sociology

See also

References

External links
https://ghoshpukur.admissions.net.in/welcome
University of North Bengal
University Grants Commission
National Assessment and Accreditation Council

Colleges affiliated to University of North Bengal
Universities and colleges in Darjeeling district
2018 establishments in West Bengal
Educational institutions established in 2018